This is a list of franchise records for the Washington Capitals of the National Hockey League.

Goals 

Most goals in a season: Alexander Ovechkin, 65 (2007–08)
Most goals in a season, rookie: Alexander Ovechkin, 52 (2005–06)
Most goals in a season, defensemen: Kevin Hatcher, 34 (1992–93)
Most goals in a career: Alexander Ovechkin, 742
Most goals in a career, defensemen: Kevin Hatcher, 149
Most powerplay goals in a season: Alexander Ovechkin, 25 (2014–15)
Most powerplay goals in a season, rookie: Alexander Ovechkin, 21 (2005–06)
Most powerplay goals in a season, defensemen: Mike Green, 18 (2008–09)
Most powerplay goals in a career: Alexander Ovechkin, 260
Most powerplay goals in a career, defensemen: Sergei Gonchar, 53
Most shorthanded goals in a season: Peter Bondra, 6 (1994–95) & Mike Gartner, 6 (1986–87)
Most shorthanded goals in a career: Peter Bondra, 32
Most game-winning goals in a season: Peter Bondra, 13 (1997–98)
Most game-winning goals in a career: Alexander Ovechkin, 110

Assists 
Most assists in a season: Dennis Maruk, 76 (1981–82)
Most assists in a season, rookie: Nicklas Backstrom, 55 (2007–08)
Most assists in a season, defenseman: Scott Stevens, 61 (1988–89)
Most assists in a career: Nicklas Backstrom, 642
Most assists in a career, defensemen John Carlson, 458''

Points 
Most points in a season: Dennis Maruk, 136 (1981–82)
Most points in a season, rookie: Alexander Ovechkin, 106 (2005–06)
Most points in a season, defensemen: Larry Murphy, 81 (1986–87)
Most points in a career: Alexander Ovechkin, 1,346
Most points in a career, defensemen: John Carlson, 588

Goaltending 

Most games played in a season: Olaf Kolzig, 73 (1999-00) & Braden Holtby, 73 (2014-15)
Most consecutive starts in a season: Braden Holtby, 23 (2014-15)
Most games played in a career: Olaf Kolzig, 711
Most wins in a season:  Braden Holtby, 48 (2015–16)
Most wins in a season, rookie: Michal Neuvirth, 27 (2010–11)
Most wins in a career: Olaf Kolzig, 301
Most shutouts in a season: Jim Carey, 9 (1995–96) & Braden Holtby, 9 (2014–15)
Most shutouts in a career: Olaf Kolzig & Braden Holtby, 35
Most losses in a season: Ron Low, 36 (1974–75)
Most losses in a career: Olaf Kolzig, 293
Most ties in a season: Olaf Kolzig, 11 (1999-00)
Most ties in a career: Olaf Kolzig, 63
Most overtime losses in a season: Olaf Kolzig, 11 (2005–06), Braden Holtby, 11 (2014–15)
Most overtime losses in a career: Olaf Kolzig, 38
Highest save % in a season, minimum 20 games: Braden Holtby, .925 (2016–17)
Highest save % in a career, minimum 82 games: Braden Holtby, .918
Lowest goals against average in a season, minimum 20 games: Braden Holtby, 2.07 (2016-2017)
Lowest goals against average in a career, minimum 82 games: Jim Carey, 2.37
Most saves in a season: Braden Holtby: 1,887 (2014–15)
Most saves in a career: Olaf Kolzig: 18,013
Most shots against in a season: Braden Holtby, 2,044 (2014–15)
Most shots against in a career: Olaf Kolzig, 19,873
Most minutes played in a season: Olaf Kolzig,4,370:50 (1999–2000)
Most minutes played in a career: Olaf Kolzig, 41,259:36

Miscellaneous individual stats 
Most career games played: Alexander Ovechkin, 1152
Most seasons in a career: Olaf Kolzig, 16
Most penalty minutes in a season: Alan May, 339 (1989–90)
Most penalty minutes in a career: Dale Hunter, 2003
Most shots in a season: Alexander Ovechkin, 528 (2008–09)
Most shots in a career: Alexander Ovechkin, 5,545
Highest plus minus in a season: Jeff Schultz, +50 (2009–10)
Highest plus minus in a career: Rod Langway, +117
Lowest plus minus in a season: Bill Mikkelson, -82 (1974–75) (NHL record)
Lowest plus minus in a career: Rick Green: -137

Team records 
(* = The 1994–95 season is excluded from this record, due to the fact a labor lockout shortened the season to 48 games)
Most points in a season: 121 (2009–10)
Fewest points in a season: 21 (1974–75)
Most wins in a season: 56 (2015–16)
Fewest wins in a season: 8 (1974–75)
Highest winning percentage in a season: .682 (2015–16)
Lowest winning percentage in a season: .131 (1974–75)
Most regulation losses in a season: 67 (1974–75)
Fewest regulation losses in a season: 15 (2009–10)
Most ties in a season: 18 (1980–81)
Most overtime losses in a season: 14 (2006–07)
Most goals scored in a season: 330 (1991–92)
Fewest goals scored in a season: 181 (1974–75)*
Most goals per game scored in a season: 4.125 (1991–92)
Fewest goals allowed in a season: 194 (1999–00)*
Most goals allowed in a season: 446 (1974–75)
Most penalty minutes in a season: 2204 (1989–90)
Fewest penalty minutes in a season: 994 (1999–00)
Most consecutive wins: 14 (2009–10)
Most consecutive wins to start the season: 7 (2011–12)

NHL records 
Most goals by a left winger in a season: Alexander Ovechkin, 65 (2007–08)
Most consecutive games by a defensemen with a goal: Mike Green, 8 (2008–09)
Lowest plus minus in a season: Bill Mikkelson, –82 (1974–75)
Fewest wins by a team in a season, minimum 70 games played, 8 (1974–75)
Lowest winning percentage by a team in a season, minimum 70 games played, .131 (1974–75)

References 

Records at Rauzulus Street

Records
Washington Capitals